Dueling scars have been seen as a "badge of honour" since as early as 1825. Known variously as " scars", "the bragging scar", "smite", "" or "", dueling scars were popular amongst upper-class Austrians and Germans involved in academic fencing at the start of the 20th century. Being a practice amongst University students, it was seen as a mark of their class and honour, due to the status of dueling societies at German and Austrian universities at the time. The practice of dueling and the associated scars was also present to some extent in the German military.

Foreign tourists visiting Germany in the late 19th century were shocked to see the students, generally with their , at major German universities such as Heidelberg, Bonn, or Jena with facial scars – some older, some more recent, and some still wrapped in bandages.

The sport of academic fencing at the time was very different from modern fencing using specially developed swords. The so-called  (or simply , 'hitter') existed in two versions. In some universities in the eastern part of Germany, the so-called  is in use which is equipped with a bell-shaped guard. In some cases, protective clothing was worn, including padding on the arm and an eye guard.

The culture of dueling scars was mainly common in Germany and Austria, to a lesser extent some Central European countries and briefly at places such as Oxford, and some other elite universities.

Within the duel, it was seen as ideal and a way of showing courage to be able to stand and take the blow, as opposed to inflicting the wound. It was important to show one's dueling prowess, but also that one was capable of taking the wound that was inflicted.

Social significance 

As the scars were gained in this particular elite social context, associated with status and an academic institution, the scars showed that one had courage and also was "good husband material". The dueling scars, while obvious, were not so serious as to leave a person disfigured or bereft of facial features. The scars were even judged by Otto von Bismarck to be a sign of bravery, and men's courage could be judged "by the number of scars on their cheeks".

Minority groups in Germany also indulged in the practice, some seeing it as an aid in their social situation. In 1874, William Osler, then a medical student on a visit to Berlin, described "one hopeful young Spanish American of my acquaintance who has one half of his face – they are usually on the left half – laid out in the most irregular manner, the cicatrices running in all directions, enclosing areas of all shapes, the relics of fourteen duels."

Nature of the scars 

Because Mensur swords are wielded with one hand and most fencers are right-handed, Mensur scars were usually targeted to the left profile, so the right profile appeared untouched. Experienced fencers, who had fought many bouts, often accumulated an array of scars. A duelist who died in 1877 "fought no less than thirteen duels but had 137 scars on the head, face and neck".

The wounds were generally not that serious, "wounds causing, as a rule, but temporary inconvenience and leaving in their traces a perpetual witness of a fight well fought. The hurts, save when inflicted in the nose, lip, or ear, are not even necessarily painful, and unless the injured man indulges too freely in drink, causing them to swell and get red, very bad scars can be avoided. The swords used are so razor-like that they cut without bruising so that the lips of the wounds can be closely pressed, leaving no great disfigurement, such, for example, as is brought about by the loss of an ear."

Sometimes, students who did not fence would scar themselves with razors in imitation, and some would pull apart their healing cuts to exacerbate the scars, although this was generally frowned upon.  Others paid doctors to slice their cheeks. The number and extremity of scars was reduced in more recent times and virtually does not exist anymore in modern Germany, and the custom of obtaining dueling scars started to die off after the Second World War.

Modern day 
Their traditions still include academic fencing and dueling scars. However duel scars do not exist anymore in modern German fraternities.

Notable persons
Gustav Stresemann
Caesar Rudolf Boettger
Curt Silberman
Fritz-Dietlof von der Schulenburg
Theodor Haubach
Ernst Kaltenbrunner
Ernst Röhm
Heinz Reinefarth
Kurt H. Debus
Helmuth Brückner
Otto Skorzeny
Rudolf Diels
Karl Eberhard Schöngarth
Henning Schulte-Noelle
Thomas Strobl
Ulrich Wetzel
Georg Diederichs
Heinrich Homann

References

Further reading

 Lisa Fetheringill Zwicker. Dueling Students: Conflict, Masculinity, and Politics in German Universities. University of Michigan Press.

Fencing
Historical fencing
Student societies in Germany
Scarification